Kansas City International Raceway was a drag-racing track in Kansas City, Missouri.
It was built in 1967, and featured two asphalt lanes, and seating for over a thousand people. It hosted its last race on November 27, 2011.  The 93 acre property was purchased by the city of Kansas City, MO to build what became Little Blue Valley Park.

References

Sports venues in Kansas City, Missouri
Motorsport venues in Missouri